Apantesis yukona is a moth of the subfamily Arctiinae. It was described by Schmidt in 2009. It is found in Yukon. The habitat consists of dry, rocky or eroding south-facing slopes.

The length of the forewings is 15.3 mm. The pattern and colour of the forewings is similar to Apantesis nevadensis superba. The hindwings are yellowish-buff to pale orange. Adults have been recorded on wing from late June to early August.

This species was formerly a member of the genus Grammia, but was moved to Apantesis along with the other species of the genera Grammia, Holarctia, and Notarctia.

Etymology
The species name refers to Yukon.

References

 Natural History Museum Lepidoptera generic names catalog

Arctiina
Moths described in 2009